Fabricio Lusa (born 11 March 1992) is a Brazilian footballer who plays for Bento Gonçalves as a midfielder.

Career statistics

References

External links

1992 births
Living people
People from Caxias do Sul
Brazilian footballers
Brazilian expatriate footballers
Association football defenders
Campeonato Brasileiro Série A players
Campeonato Brasileiro Série C players
Campeonato Brasileiro Série D players
Ykkönen players
Club Sportivo Sergipe players
Esporte Clube Bahia players
Esporte Clube Juventude players
Capivariano Futebol Clube players
Batatais Futebol Clube players
Clube Atlético Linense players
Veranópolis Esporte Clube Recreativo e Cultural players
Associação Olímpica de Itabaiana players
AC Kajaani players
Brazilian expatriate sportspeople in Finland
Expatriate footballers in Finland
Sportspeople from Rio Grande do Sul